The Battle of Rugao-Huangqiao (Ru Huang Zhangdou, 如黄战斗) was a battle fought between the communists and the nationalists during the Chinese Civil War in the post World War II era and resulted in communist victory.  The battle was a one seven major battles in Central Jiangsu Campaign.

Order of battle
Nationalists
A regiment of the 79th Brigade
99th Brigade of the Reorganized 69th Division
The 160th Brigade
The 187th Brigade
The Reorganized 25th Division
Communists
The 1st Division
The 6th Division
The 5th Brigade
The Specialized Regiment

After battles fought at Dingyan (丁堰) and Linxin (林梓) in Central Jiangsu Campaign, the communists had severed the Rugao – Nantong Highway, and the nationalist 187th Brigade defending Rugao was isolated.  To avert the situation, the nationalist 99th Brigade of the Reorganized 69th Division was ordered to be deployed from the Yellow Bridge (Huangqiao, 黄桥) Town to reinforce Rugao.  Meanwhile, the nationalist Reorganized 25th Division deployed at Yangzhou and Jiangdu (江都) was ordered to attack Shaobo (邵伯) in the north.  The communist, in response, ordered their 1st Division, 6th Division, 5th Brigade and the Specialized Regiment to attack Taizhou, Jiangsu from Dingyan (丁堰) and Linxin (林梓) regions, in the hope of luring the nationalist Reorganized 25th Division to abandon its attack on Shaobo (邵伯) and reinforce Taizhou, Jiangsu, so that it could be ambushed on its way.  Although the communist plan succeeded in forcing the nationalists to abandon their attack on Shaobo (邵伯), the planned ambush of the nationalist Reorganized 25th Division failed to materialize.  Instead, the nationalist 99th Brigade of the Reorganized 69th Division became the unfortunate victim.

In the morning of August 25, 1946, the nationalist 99th Brigade of the Reorganized 69th Division begun its march toward Rugao from Yellow Bridge (Huangqiao, 黄桥) Town, with nationalist 187th Brigade and a regiment of the nationalist 79th Brigade coming out of Rugao to meet their comrades-in-arms.  By the noon, the nationalist 99th Brigade of the Reorganized 69th Division met the communist main force on the road from Yellow Bridge (Huangqiao, 黄桥) Town to Rugao.  The communist 1st Division and 6th Division immediately launched their assault on the nationalists, successfully besieging the enemy in isolated pockets in the regions of Fenjie (分界) and Jiali (加力).  The communists decided to concentrate their forces 4 to 5 times than that of their enemy to annihilate the weakest enemy first, and then the stronger one.

On August 26, 1946, the nationalist 99th Brigade of the Reorganized 69th Division at Fenjie (分界) region was first to be completely annihilated, and on the next day, the nationalist 187th Brigade and a regiment of the nationalist 79th Brigade at Jiali (加力) region was also annihilated completely.  The victorious communists then launched their assault on Yellow Bridge (Huangqiao, 黄桥) Town, and remaining 5 companies of the nationalist 160th Brigade simply could not challenge the overwhelmingly superior enemy force, and gave up the town and surrendered.  With the fall of Yellow Bridge (Huangqiao, 黄桥) Town, the nationalists was forced to cease their offensive to regroup for the next stage of the campaign and the battle ended.

See also
List of battles of the Chinese Civil War
National Revolutionary Army
History of the People's Liberation Army
Chinese Civil War

References

Zhu, Zongzhen and Wang, Chaoguang, Liberation War History, 1st Edition, Social Scientific Literary Publishing House in Beijing, 2000,  (set)
Zhang, Ping, History of the Liberation War, 1st Edition, Chinese Youth Publishing House in Beijing, 1987,  (pbk.)
Jie, Lifu, Records of the Liberation War: The Decisive Battle of Two Kinds of Fates, 1st Edition, Hebei People's Publishing House in Shijiazhuang, 1990,  (set)
Literary and Historical Research Committee of the Anhui Committee of the Chinese People's Political Consultative Conference, Liberation War, 1st Edition, Anhui People's Publishing House in Hefei, 1987, 
Li, Zuomin, Heroic Division and Iron Horse: Records of the Liberation War, 1st Edition, Chinese Communist Party History Publishing House in Beijing, 2004, 
Wang, Xingsheng, and Zhang, Jingshan, Chinese Liberation War, 1st Edition, People's Liberation Army Literature and Art Publishing House in Beijing, 2001,  (set)
Huang, Youlan, History of the Chinese People's Liberation War, 1st Edition, Archives Publishing House in Beijing, 1992, 
Liu Wusheng, From Yan'an to Beijing: A Collection of Military Records and Research Publications of Important Campaigns in the Liberation War, 1st Edition, Central Literary Publishing House in Beijing, 1993, 
Tang, Yilu and Bi, Jianzhong, History of Chinese People's Liberation Army in Chinese Liberation War, 1st Edition, Military Scientific Publishing House in Beijing, 1993 – 1997,  (Volum 1), 7800219615 (Volum 2), 7800219631 (Volum 3), 7801370937 (Volum 4), and 7801370953 (Volum 5)

Conflicts in 1946
Battles of the Chinese Civil War
1946 in China
Military history of Jiangsu